Anacampsinae is a subfamily of moths in the family Gelechiidae.

Taxonomy and systematics

Anacampsini Bruand, 1850
Anacampsis Curtis, 1827
Aproaerema Durrant, 1897
Battaristis Meyrick, 1914
Chaliniastis Meyrick, 1904
Compsolechia Meyrick, 1918
Holophysis Walsingham, 1910
Idiophantis Meyrick, 1904
Iwaruna Gozmány, 1957
Leucogoniella T. B. Fletcher, 1940
Mesophleps Hübner, [1825]
Pauroneura Turner, 1919
Pseudosophronia Corley, 2001
Scindalmota Turner, 1919
Strobisia Clemens, 1860
Stomopteryx Heinemann, 1870
Syncopacma Meyrick, 1925
Tricyanaula Meyrick, 1925
Untomia Busck, 1906
?Anacampsini
Acrophiletis Meyrick, 1932
Alsodryas Meyrick, 1914
Anastomopteryx Janse, 1951
Beltheca Busck, 1914
Blastovalva Janse, 1960
Calliphylla Janse, 1963
Capnosema Janse, 1958
Chalcomima Meyrick, 1929
Clepsimacha Meyrick, 1934
Diastaltica Walsingham, 1910
Octonodula Janse, 1951
Parabola Janse, 1950
Perioristica Walsingham, 1910
Promolopica Meyrick, 1925
Chelariini Le Marchand, 1947
Amblyphylla Janse, 1960
Anthistarcha Meyrick, 1925
Aponoea Walsingham, 1905
Axyrostola Meyrick, 1923
Bagdadia Amsel, 1949
Crasimorpha Meyrick, 1923
Dactylethrella T. B. Fletcher, 1940
Dendrophilia Ponomarenko, 1993
Empalactis Meyrick, 1925
Encolapta Meyrick, 1913
Ethmiopsis Meyrick in Caradja & Meyrick, 1935
Eustalodes Meyrick, 1927
Faristenia Ponomarenko, 1991
Haplochela Meyrick, 1923
Holcophora Staudinger, 1871
Hypatima Hübner, [1825]
Metatactis Janse, 1949
Neofaculta Gozmány, 1955
Nothris Hübner, [1825]
Oestomorpha Walsingham, 1911
Paralida Clarke, 1958
Paraselotis Janse, 1960
Pessograptis Meyrick, 1923
Prostomeus Busck, 1903
Pilocrates Meyrick, 1920
Ptychovalva Janse, 1958
Tornodoxa Meyrick, 1921
Anarsiini Amsel, 1977 (often included in Chelariini)
 Anarsia

References

 , 2013: A molecular analysis of the Gelechiidae (Lepidoptera, Gelechioidea) with an interpretative grouping of its taxa. Systematic Entomology 38 (2): 334–348. Abstract: .
 , 2008: Functional morphology of the male genitalia in Gelechiidae (Lepidoptera) and its significance for phylogenetic analysis. Nota lepidopterologica 31 (2): 179–198. Full Article: .

 
Gelechiidae
Moth subfamilies